Lok Fu is a place in Wong Tai Sin District, Kowloon, Hong Kong. It is located to the east of Kowloon Tsai, the west of Wong Tai Sin and the north of Kowloon City.

History
The only village in this area in the 19th century was Ta Ku Ling or Ta Kwu Ling, not to be confused with the other two villages of the same name in Hong Kong (Ta Ku Ling in Sai Kung district and Ta Kwu Ling in North district). It is recorded on an 1866 map and was part of an alliance of seven nearby villages led by Nga Tsin Wai Tsuen. It was located where Morse Park is now.

In the 1940s many refugees arrived in the area, which was then known as Lo Fu Ngam (literally "Tiger's Den" in Chinese). There were many squatter huts on the hillsides. After the construction of the public housing estate started in 1957 with the first resettlement blocks being built, Lo Fu Ngam was renamed as Lok Fu which literally means "Happiness and Wealth" in Chinese. All the housing estates were rebuilt in the 1980s and 1990s. Wang Tau Hom complex (now Lok Fu Place), built in 1985, was designed by the architects Alan Fitch (architect of Hong Kong City Hall) & W.N. Chung (architect of the 1971 (now replaced) Peak Tower).

Features
The centre of Lok Fu contains the Lok Fu Place shopping centre. The shopping mall was renovated in 2008-9 while the market was renovated in 2013. The anchor tenant of the shopping mall is the Japanese department store Uny.

Besides the shopping mall, Lok Fu primarily consists of public housing estates:
 Lok Fu Estate
 Wang Tau Hom Estate

The Lok Fu area has many parks:
 Morse Park sections 3 and 4 separate Lok Fu from, respectively, Wong Tai Sin and Tung Tau Estate
 Junction Road Park - housing 6 tennis courts, a 7-a-side soccer pitch, 2 basketball courts, jogging track, pebble walking trail, children's playground and fitness equipment for the elderly
 Lok Fu Park - a wooded, hilly area between Junction Road Park and Kowloon Tsai Park
 Lok Fu Service Reservoir Rest Garden - a large lawn located on a hill, adjacent to Lok Fu Park and Kowloon Tsai Park; to the south of the garden is Checkerboard Hill
 Lok Fu Recreation Ground - with an 11-a-side soccer/hockey pitch

Other places of interest in Lok Fu include:
 Lok Fu Tin Hau Temple ( or )
 Wing Kwong Pentecostal Holiness Church
 Hong Kong Buddhist Hospital

Transport
Lok Fu is served by Lok Fu station on the MTR's Kwun Tong line.

Junction Road passes through Lok Fu.

Education
Lok Fu is in Primary One Admission (POA) School Net 43. Within the school net are multiple aided schools (operated independently but funded with government money) and Wong Tai Sin Government Primary School.

References

 
Wong Tai Sin District
Places in Hong Kong
New Kowloon